The University of Missouri Graduate School is one of the 20 academic schools and colleges of the University of Missouri. It oversees masters and doctoral degree candidates in almost 100 programs campuswide. In addition, the university offers many professional degrees through the School of Medicine and School of Law.

References

External links
Official site

Graduate School
Missouri
University subdivisions in Missouri